The Aeronca Model 7 Champion, commonly known as the "Champ", or "Airknocker", is a single-engine light airplane with a high wing, generally configured with fixed conventional landing gear and tandem seating for two occupants.

Designed for flight training<ref name="1946_12_flying">Flying Dec. 1946, as quoted in Flying Annual & Pilots' Guide,' 1971 ed. [Ziff-Davis], NY'</ref>
and personal use—and specifically developed to compete with the popular Piper Cub. It entered production in the United States in 1945, spawning one of the most popular, and longest-produced, light airplane models in the world.Wilkinson, Stephan, "First Flight: The Champ," Flying, February 1971: [Ziff-Davis], NY, as retrieved 2016-01-30 from Google Books, and as reproduced in print edition of Flying Annual & Pilots' Guide, 1971 ed., Ziff Davis, NY.

In addition to the Champ's large-volume production by Aeronca Aircraft, it was revived in variations by the Champion Aircraft Company in the 1950s and 1960s, and then again in further variants by Bellanca in the 1960s and 1970s, and by American Champion Aircraft in the early 2000s.

To take advantage of the new light-sport aircraft (LSA) category, the Champion was returned to production in 2007, but was discontinued by mid-2019.

Design and development
The Aeronca 7 Champion line—developed in the mid-1940s as a post-World War II response to the popular Piper J-3 Cub—uses similar design features (already featured in Aeronca's wartime designs, the Aeronca Model T, Aeronca Defender, and Aeronca L-3), but also incorporates aspects of traditional Aeronca designs, including the internal main trusswork of the fuselage frame. Like its predecessors and initial rivals, the high-wing, two-seat plane has tandem seating, conventional landing gear (tailwheel-equipped), and a small piston engine.Sargent, Sparky Barnes, "A Honey of a Champion! The Baker family's award-winning Aeronca," Vintage Airplane, Dec., 2007, vol.35, #12, Experimental Aircraft Association

As with many light aircraft of the time, the Champ's fuselage and tail surfaces are constructed of welded metal tubing. The outer shape of the fuselage is created by a combination of wooden formers and longerons, covered with fabric. The cross-section of the metal fuselage truss is triangular, a design feature which can be traced all the way back to the earliest Aeronca C-2 design of the late 1920s.

The strut-braced wings of the Champ are, like the fuselage and tail surfaces, fabric-covered, and use aluminum ribs. Most Champs were built with wooden spars. American Champion has been using aluminum spars in the aircraft it has produced, and has also made the aluminum-spar wings available for retrofit installation on older aircraft.

Like the Piper Cub with which it competed, the Champ features tandem seating. However, while the J-3 model of the Cub is flown solo from the rear seat, the Champ can be soloed from the front, giving improved forward visibility, particularly on the ground and during takeoffs, landings, and climbs. The Champ offers far better visibility than the Cub, allowing 300 degrees of visibility to a front-seated pilot, and has a wider cabin than the Cub.Karant, Max, "Flying Check Pilot: The Aeronca Chief ," Flying Magazine, Dec., 1946. Additionally, an uncommon Champ variant—the 7HC—was produced with an enlarged rear seat allowing two passengers to be carried.

The landing gear of most Champs is in a conventional arrangement, though two variants with tricycle gear were produced, and a model with reversed tricycle gear was tried. Conventional-gear Champs feature a steerable tailwheel and most have steel tube main gear which use an oleo strut for shock absorption. One variant utilized sprung-steel main gear, and American Champion uses aluminum gear legs in its production model of the Champ. Tricycle-gear Champs use the steel tube and oleo strut main gear, mating these with an oleo strut nose gear.

Models 7AC, 7CCM, 7DC, and 7EC were approved as floatplanes, with the addition of floats and vertical stabilizer fins; the floatplane versions were designated the S7AC, S7CCM, S7DC, and S7EC, respectively. The 7GC and 7HC may also be operated with floats but are not given a special designation in this configuration. All floatplane versions have increased gross weights over the corresponding landplanes.

Operational history
Built by Aeronca Aircraft Corporation, the Champ first flew in 1944, and entered production in 1945. As an economical postwar rival to the Piper Cub (which it largely improved upon), the Champ was popular with training schools who were training veterans returning from World War II, by the thousands, with government funding through the G.I. Bill.

The original model 7AC Champion initially sold by the thousands, peaking in 1946, as Aeronca developed the highest-volume production line in general aviation. Between 1946 and 1947, Aeronca was producing an average 30 light aircraft per day (peaking at 50 per day at one point). But 1946 was a momentary explosion in lightplane production, industry-wide. The postwar boom-and-bust of the late 1940s and early 1950s brought an abrupt end to the massive sales, and—like the rest of the U.S. lightplane industry—Aeronca production dropped to a small fraction of 1946–1947 sales.

Engine upgrades in 1947, 1948 and 1949 resulted in the Models 7BCM, 7DC and the electric-system-equipped 7EC, all distinguished from the 7AC by a larger vertical tail than predecessors, to compensate for the greater torque and p-factor of the larger engines.

Some of these Champ variants were acquired by the U.S. Army Air Forces (USAAF) and its successor, the U.S. Air Force (USAF), particularly for use by the U.S. Army Ground Forces and the National Guard, as replacements for the Piper L-4 variant of the Piper Cub, used as an observation and liaison aircraft. The Aeronca Champ military variants were labeled L-16, L-16A and L-16B.

By the time production ended in 1951, the company had sold more than 8,000 Champions, mostly 7AC Champs (approx. 7,200).

Aeronca ceased all production of light aircraft in 1951, and the Champ design was sold in 1954 to Champion Aircraft, who continued production of some of the more advanced variants of the Champ, from the 1950s into the early 1960s—gradually modifying them into the aerobatic Champion Citabria.

Champion Aircraft was acquired in 1970 by Bellanca Aircraft which continued production of their Champ-derived Citabria and Decathlon designs.

In 1971, Bellanca introduced the 7ACA version of the Champ as a more basic complement to their other designs, as the least expensive, and lowest-performance, commercially produced light plane on the market at the time.

Only a handful of 7ACAs were built between 1971 and 1972. Bellanca ceased all production in the early 1980s.

American Champion Aircraft Corporation acquired the Champ and related designs in 1989. In 2001, they were rumored to be considering a reintroduction of the Champ design as a 7EC powered by a Jabiru Aircraft engine. While a test version was flown, this combination was not put into production. With the creation of the light-sport aircraft (LSA) category of aircraft in the United States by the FAA, American Champion in late 2007 began producing a revised version of the 7EC powered by the  Continental O-200-A. The new production aircraft are type certified, but also qualify to be flown by sport pilots in the United States. Although the fuselage and cowling contours are similar to the original-production models, the new aircraft used the windows, interior, door, and windscreen of the modern Citabria. The manufacturer was considering various further weight-reduction measures including the use of the lightened Continental O-200D engine previously offered in the Cessna 162 Skycatcher. However, the revived 7EC was dropped from production by mid-2019.

Standard-production 7AC, 7BCM (L-16A), 7CCM (L-16B), 7DC, and 7ACA models qualify as U.S. Light Sport Aircraft.

Variants
Various versions of the Champ have been tested and produced since 1944, including military, aerobatic, cropduster, tricycle-gear and (as the 402 Lancer) a twin-engined variant.

The derivative Citabria designs — models 7ECA, 7GCAA, 7GCBC, and 7KCAB — are discussed in a separate article, as is the twin-engined 402 Lancer. Floatplane variants are designated by an "S" prefix and are discussed together with the standard respective land variant.

7AC Champion

Introduced in 1945, the 7AC Champion ("Champ") was the first (and, by far, the most popular) version of the design.
 (Other 65-hp engines by Lycoming and Franklin were also fitted.) A supplemental type certificate allows the installation of a Lycoming O-235. The Champ featured a conventional landing gear configuration, with shock absorption in the main gear provided by oleo struts. The aircraft had no electrical system. It is distinguishable from nearly all other variants by the absence of a dorsal fin at the leading edge of the vertical tail (most later models had the enlarged tail). Approximately 7,200 were built between 1945 and 1948—far outnumbering all other subsequent variants combined, and far outnumbering most rival designs of the period. Some were acquired by the U.S. military and designated L-16—not to be confused with the L-16A and L-16B derived from later Champ variants.

7ACA
1971 reintroduction by Bellanca, a modernized version of the design which made it a variant of the Citabria line.

7BCM, L-16A

Upgraded version introduced in 1947 with an  Continental C85 and "no-bounce" version of the main landing gear. All of the 7BCM production went to the military as model L-16A. Gross weight and fuel capacity are unchanged from the 7AC. 509 were built.

7B-X
Prototype, 1 produced, serial number 7-BX-1, FAA aircraft registration number was N4084E but registration was canceled on 4 October 1951, no other details known.

7CCM, L-16B

Gross weight increases to  when configured as an S7CCM floatplane. 100 L-16B/7CCM aircraft were built.

7DC

7EC Traveler

The last Champ produced at Aeronca was a 7EC, and when Champion reintroduced the Champ in 1955, it was with their version of the 7EC, very little changed from Aeronca's. An enhanced version called the Champion DeLuxe Traveler offered a metal propeller with spinner, wheel pants, a steerable tailwheel, and navigation lights.

773 7EC aircraft were produced during the original production run.

Differing in a number of ways from earlier 7ECs, this new version in particular replaced the wood-spar wings of the earlier versions with a metal-spar wing and used aluminum gear legs. To fit within the Light Sport requirements, the maximum weight was reduced to 1,320 pounds (599 kilograms). The aircraft was discontinued by mid-2019.

7FC Tri-Traveler

In 1957, Champion brought out the 7FC, which is similar to the 7EC but with tricycle landing gear instead of conventional (tailwheel) gear, oleo struts on all 3 wheels, and extra frame bracing for the nosewheel. Factory standard equipment was comparable to the 7EC DeLuxe Traveler.

472 7FC aircraft were built.

7GC Sky Trac
Generally similar to 7EC but with a  Lycoming O-290-D2B engine and modified fuselage structure for increased gross weight.

7GCA Sky Trac
Agricultural variant of the 7GC with identical gross weight but with a  Lycoming O-320-A2B engine. 396 were made.

7HC DX'er
Similar to 7GC with identical gross weights for landplane and floatplane versions, but with a front seat control yoke instead of a control stick, modified fuselage structure, tricycle landing gear, and an enlarged rear seat for two occupants. 39 were produced.

7JC Tri-Con
Similar to 7EC but with reverse tricycle undercarriage; however, the aircraft may be converted to a standard tailwheel undercarriage and operated at a  gross weight. 25 were built.

7KC Olympia
7GCA with smaller wings, redesigned empennage, other aerodynamic refinements, deletion of rear-seat flight controls, and minor detail changes. 4 were built.

Specifications (7AC)

See also

Notes

References

 
 
 

 Taylor, J. H. (ed) (1989) Jane's Encyclopedia of Aviation''. Studio Editions: London. p. 28
 airliners.net

External links

Champion
Light-sport aircraft
1940s United States civil utility aircraft
Aeronca aircraft
Champion aircraft
Single-engined tractor aircraft
High-wing aircraft
Aircraft first flown in 1944